The Union of the Independent Trade Unions of Albania (BSPSH), is a National Confederation of Trade unions in Albania. It was established in 1991 and held its first national conference in February, 1992. It has an estimated membership of 85,000.

Originally led by Valer Xheka - after a tumultuous and violent transition, including charges of a political takeover by Azem Hajdari, in 1998 the Supreme Court of Albania recognized Xhevdet Lubani as the legitimate leader.

References

External links
 www.icftu.org entry in the ITUC address book.

International Trade Union Confederation
Trade unions in Albania
National federations of trade unions
Trade unions established in 1991
1991 establishments in Albania